Sanborn (formerly, Plano) is an unincorporated community in Kern County, California.

References

Unincorporated communities in Kern County, California
Mojave, California
Populated places in the Mojave Desert
Unincorporated communities in California